Villa Park, New Jersey may refer to:

 Villa Park, Trenton, New Jersey in Mercer County
 Villa Park, Monmouth County, New Jersey in Spring Lake Heights